Prosalirus is the name given to a fossilised prehistoric frog found in the Kayenta Formation of Arizona in 1981 by Farish Jenkins. The type, and currently only, species is Prosalirus bitis.

Description
The skeleton has primitive features, but has mostly lost the salamander-like traits of its ancestors. It has a skeleton designed to absorb the force of jumping with its hind legs and tail. It also has long hip bones, long hind leg bones, and long ankle bones, all similar to modern frogs, and is as of 2009 the earliest true frog. 

The name comes from the Latin verb prosalire, meaning 'to leap forward'. It is thought to have lived during the Early Jurassic epoch 190 million years ago, well before the first known modern frog, Callobatrachus.

As of 2020, only three Prosalirus skeletons have been discovered.

Habitat
The Prosalirus is believed to have lived in brackish, freshwater, and terrestrial environments.

References

Early Jurassic amphibians
Jurassic amphibians of North America
Early Jurassic animals of North America
Jurassic Arizona
Paleontology in Arizona
Transitional fossils
Prehistoric tetrapod genera
Fossil taxa described in 1995
Early Jurassic genus first appearances
Early Jurassic extinctions